The following is an alphabetical list of topics related to Indigenous peoples in Canada, comprising the First Nations, Inuit and Métis peoples.

0–9
1969 White Paper
1981 Restigouche raid

A
Aatsista-Mahkan (Running rabbit)
Abenaki mythology
Aboriginal Curatorial Collective
Aboriginal Day of Action
Aboriginal land claim
Aboriginal Multimedia Society of Alberta
Aboriginal Nurses Association of Canada
Aboriginal Peoples Television Network
Aboriginal People's Party
Aboriginal Peoples Party of Canada
Aboriginal police in Canada
Aboriginal title
Aboriginal Voices
Aboriginal whaling
Agreement Respecting a New Relationship Between the Cree Nation and the Government of Quebec
Aleutian tradition
Allied Tribes of British Columbia
Amauti – Inuit parka
Angakkuq
Anglo-Métis
Anishinaabe traditional beliefs
Anishinaabe tribal political organizations
Archaic period in the Americas
Arctic Council
Arctic small tool tradition
Assembly of First Nations leadership conventions
Athabaskan languages
Attorney General of Canada v. Lavell
Azeban

B
Band society
Battle of Cut Knife
Battle of Duck Lake
Battle of Cut Knife
Battle of Fallen Timbers
Battle of Fish Creek
Battle of Fort Pitt
Battle of Frenchman's Butte
Battle of Hudson's Bay
Battle of Loon Lake
Battle of Long Sault
Battle of the Belly River
Battle of Seven Oaks (1816)
Bannock (food)
Beaver Wars
Bell of Batoche
Beothuk
Bibliography of Canada
Big Bear (mistahi-maskwa)
Birnirk culture
Blackfoot language
Blackfoot music
Blackfoot religion
Blond Eskimos
Bloody Falls Massacre
Bridge River Rapids
2002 British Columbia aboriginal treaty referendum
British Columbia Treaty Process
British North America Acts
Brocket 99
Burnt Church Crisis
Bungee language

C
Calder v. British Columbia (Attorney General)
Canada
Classification of indigenous peoples of the Americas
Canadian Aboriginal law
Canadian Aboriginal syllabics
Canadian House of Commons Standing Committee on Aboriginal Affairs and Northern Development
Canadian Indian residential school system
Canadian Polar Commission
Canadian Senate Standing Committee on Aboriginal Peoples
Caribou Inuit
Centre for Indigenous Theatre
Center for World Indigenous Studies
Chief Pontiac (Obwandiyag)
Chimney Rock (Canada)
Chippewas of Sarnia Band v. Canada (Attorney General)
Christ Church Royal Chapel
CHRS-FM
Classification of indigenous peoples of the Americas
Indigenous languages of the Americas
Arctic cultural area – (Eskimo–Aleut languages)
Subarctic culture area – (Na-Dene languages – Algic languages)
Eastern Woodlands (Northeast) cultural area – (Algic languages and Iroquoian languages)
Plains cultural area – (Siouan–Catawban languages)
Northwest Plateau cultural area – (Salishan languages)
Northwest Coast cultural area – (Penutian languages, Tsimshianic languages and Wakashan languages)
Coast Salish peoples
Coast Salish art
Coast Salish languages
Coast Tsimshian
Congress of Aboriginal Peoples
Constitution Act, 1982
Council of Three Fires
Section Thirty-five of the Constitution Act, 1982
Section Twenty-five of the Canadian Charter of Rights and Freedoms
Copper Inuit
Corbiere v. Canada (Minister of Indian and Northern Affairs)
Cree syllabics
Crowfoot (Isapo-Muxika)
Culture of the Tlingit

D
Daniels v. Canada
De-ba-jeh-mu-jig Theatre Group
Declaration of the Lillooet Tribe
Declaration on the Rights of Indigenous Peoples
Definitions and identity of indigenous peoples
Delgamuukw v. British Columbia
Disc number
Dorset culture
Douglas Treaties
Dreamcatcher
The Dead Dog Café Comedy Hour

E
Eastern Woodlands tribes
Egushawa
Enumclaw and Kapoonis
Eskimo
Eskimo–Aleut languages
Eskimo kissing
European colonization of the Americas
French colonization of the Americas
British colonisation of the Americas
Eva Aariak
Exovedate

F
Federal Interlocutor for Métis and Non-Status Indians
Federation of Saskatchewan Indian Nations
First Nations (A main article)	
First Nations Bank of Canada
First Nations Composer Initiative
First Nations Government (Canada)
First Nations Health Authority
First Nations Periodicals
First Nations Police (Ontario)	
First Nations Summit	
First Nations Technical Institute
First Nations Transportation
First Nations University Students' Association	
First Nations University of Canada	
First Nations in Alberta	
First Nations in Atlantic Canada	
First Nations in British Columbia	
First Nations in Manitoba	
First Nations in New Brunswick	
First Nations in Ontario
First Nations in Quebec
First Nations in Saskatchewan	
First Nations language
First Nations music
First Nations social issues
First Nations studies
First Peoples' Heritage, Language and Culture Council
First Battle of Bloody Creek
Five Medals
Folsom point
Folsom tradition
Franco-Indian alliance
Fraser Canyon War
French and Indian War
Battle of Fort Beauséjour (June 16, 1755)
Siege of Louisbourg (June 8 – July 26, 1758)
Battle of Fort Frontenac (August 25, 1758)
Battle of the Thousand Islands, August 16–25, 1760
Battle of Beauport (July 31, 1759)
Battle of the Plains of Abraham (September 13, 1759)
Battle of Sainte-Foy (April 28, 1760)
Battle of Restigouche, July 3–8, 1760
Battle of Signal Hill  September 15, 1762
Food of the Tlingit
Frog Lake Massacre
Fort Defiance (British Columbia)
 Fort Fraser, British Columbia
 Fort Garry
 Fort Saint Vrain
 Fort Simpson (Columbia Department)
 Fort St. James, British Columbia
 Fort Stikine
 Fort Vancouver
 Fort Vancouver National Historic Site
 Fort Vasquez
 Fort Ware, British Columbia
 The Fur Trade at Lachine National Historic Site
 Fur brigade
 Fred Quilt inquiry
 Fur seal

G
Genetic history of indigenous peoples of the Americas
Gabriel Dumont
Gabriel Dumont Institute
Genetic history of indigenous peoples of the Americas
Y-DNA haplogroups in Indigenous peoples of the Americas
Gradual Civilization Act
Grand Council of Treaty 3
Grand River land dispute
Great Peace of Montreal
 Great Spirit
 Gitche Manitou
Gitksan language
Gitxsan Treaty Society
Glooscap
Gustafsen Lake Standoff

H
Haplogroup C-M217 (Y-DNA)
Haplogroup Q-M242 (Y-DNA)
Haplogroup Q-NWT01 (Y-DNA)
Haplogroup Q-P89.1 (Y-DNA)
Haplogroup Q-M3 (Y-DNA)
Haplogroup R1 (Y-DNA)
Haldimand Proclamation
Hamatla Treaty Society
Haida Argillite Carvings
Haida language
Haida manga
Haida mythology
Haisla language
Head-Smashed-In Buffalo Jump
Heiltsuk language
High Arctic relocation
History of Canada
History of Alberta#Pre-Confederation
History of the west coast of North America
History of Squamish and Tsleil-Waututh Longshoremen, 1863–1963
Hivernants
Hopewell tradition
Hudson's Bay Company
Hul'qumi'num Treaty Group

I
Igloo
Ihalmiut
Indian Act
Indian Agent (Canada)
Indian Department
Indian Health Transfer Policy (Canada)
Indigenous peoples of the Pacific Northwest Coast
Indians of Canada Pavilion
Indian Posse
Indian Register
Indian Residential Schools Truth and Reconciliation Commission
Indian Reserve (1763)
Indian settlement
Indian and Northern Affairs Canada
Indigenous archaeology
Indigenous Canadian personalities
Indigenous Dialogues
Indigenous (ecology)
Indigenous food security in Canada
Indigenous intellectual property
Indigenous knowledge
Indigenous land claims in Canada
Indigenous language
Indigenous languages of the Americas
Indigenous medicine
Indigenous music of Canada
Indigenous peoples by geographic regions
Indigenous peoples in Northern Canada
Indigenous peoples in Quebec
Indigenous peoples of the Americas
Indigenous peoples of the Pacific Northwest Coast
Indigenous rights
Indspire
Indspire Awards
International Work Group for Indigenous Affairs
Institute of Indigenous Government
Inu-Yupiaq
Inuit
Inuit–Aleut
Inuit art
Museum of Inuit Art
Inuit astronomy
Inuit Boots
Inuit Broadcasting Corporation
Inuit Circumpolar Council
Inuit Circumpolar Conference
Inuit culture
Inuit diet
Inuit Dog
Inuit grammar
Inuit language
Inuit mask
Inuit music
Inuit mythology
Inuit numerals
Inuit phonology
Inuit Qaujimajatuqangit
Inuit snow goggles
Inuit syllabary
Inuit Tapiriit Kanatami
Inuit throat singing
Inuit weapons
Inuinnaqtun
Inuktitut
Inuktitut writing
Inuktitut syllabics
Inuvialuktun
Inuvialuit Settlement Region
Inukshuk
Inuktitut (magazine)
Isuma
Iroquois
Iroquois kinship
Iroquois mythology
Ipperwash Crisis
Ipperwash Inquiry

J
James Bay and Northern Quebec Agreement
James Bay Cree hydroelectric conflict
Jenu
Jesuit missions in North America
Jordan's principle
Journal of Aboriginal Health
Journal of Indigenous Studies
Juno Award for Aboriginal Recording of the Year

K
Kabloona
Kahnawake Gaming Commission
Kahnawake Iroquois and the Rebellions of 1837–38
Kainai
Kamloops Wawa
Kayak
Kwak'wala
Kwakwaka'wakw mythology
Kwakwaka'wakw art
Kwakwaka'wakw music
Kegedonce Press
Koyukons
King George's War
King William's War
Kwäday Dän Ts’ìnchi
Kwakwaka'wakw
Kwakwaka'wakw art
Kruger and al. v. The Queen
Kudlik

L
 Lacrosse
Lachine massacre
Land ownership in Canada
Laurel complex
List of archaeological periods (North America)
Lithic stage (pre 8000 BC)
Archaic stage (c. 8000 – 1000 BC)
Formative stage (c. 1000 BC – AD 500)
Classic stage (c. AD 500–1200)
Post-Classic stage (c. 1200–1900)
List of bibliographical materials on the potlatch
List of Canadians
List of Canadians#Aboriginal leaders
 Big Bear (1825–1888) – Cree leader
 Brant, Joseph (1742–1807) – Mohawk leader
 Brant, Mary (1736–1796) – leader of Six Nations women's federation
 Riel, Louis (1844–1885) – leader of two Métis uprisings
 Piapot (c. 1816–1908) – Cree Chief
 Tecumseh (1768–1813) – Shawnee leader
 Nicola 1780/1785 – c. 1865 – Grand chief of the Okanagan people, and jointly chief of the Nlaka'pamux
 Nicola Athapaskan alliance in the Nicola Valley and of the Kamloops group of the Secwepemc
 Cumshewa – 18th-century Haida chief at the inlet now bearing his name
 Maquinna – 18th-century Nuu-chah-nulth chief (Yuquot/Mowachaht).
 Wickanninish 19th-century Nuu-chah-nulth chief (Opitsaht/Tla-o-qui-aht)
 August Jack Khatsahlano – Squamish
 Joe Capilano – Squamish
 Harriet Nahanee – Squamish and Nuu-chah-nulth (Pacheedaht)
 Andy Paull – Squamish
 Frank Calder (politician) – Nisga'a
 Elijah Harper – Cree and/or Ojibwe
 Guujaaw – modern-day Haida leader
 Shawn Atleo
 William Beynon
 Rose Charlie
 Arthur Wellington Clah
 Heber Clifton
 Harley Desjarlais
 Alfred Dudoward
 Chief Shakes
 Dan George – Tsleil-Waututh First Nation (Burrard)
 Joseph Gosnell – Nisga'a
 Simon Gunanoot – Gitxsan
 Chief Hunter Jack ( –d.1905) – St'at'imc
 Mary John, Sr.
 Klattasine – Tsilhqot'in war chief, surrendered on terms of amnesty in times of war, hanged for murder
 Koyah – 18th-century chief of the Haida 
 George Manuel
 Shanawdithit
 Stewart Phillip
 Steven Point – modern Sto:lo leader, Lieutenant-Governor of British Columbia 2007–12
 James Sewid – Kwakwaka'wakw
 Alec Thomas
Walter Wright
List of Chinook Jargon placenames
List of community radio stations in Canada
List of conflicts in Canada
List of English words from indigenous languages of the Americas
List of First Nations governments
List of First Nations people
List of First Nations peoples
List of Indian reserves in Canada
List of Indian reserves in Canada by population
List of Indian residential schools in Canada
List of indigenous peoples
List of Canadian Inuit
List of Métis people
List of place names in Canada of Aboriginal origin
List of placenames of indigenous origin in the Americas
List of pre-Columbian cultures
List of tribal councils in British Columbia
List of writers from peoples indigenous to the Americas
Looting of Battleford
  Louis Riel
 Trial of Louis Riel 
 Louis Riel: A Comic-Strip Biography

M
Makah language
Malsumis
Manitoba Band Operated Schools
Manitou
Maritime Archaic
McKenna-McBride Royal Commission
McNally Robinson Aboriginal Book of the Year Award
Mica Bay incident
Michif language
Minister of Aboriginal and Northern Affairs (Manitoba)
Minister of Indian Affairs and Northern Development (Canada)
Missing and murdered Indigenous women
Mitchell v. M.N.R.
Models of migration to the New World
Mokotakan
Meech Lake Accord
Métis people (Canada)
Anglo-Métis
Métis Flag
Métis French
Metis Comprehensive Land Claim Agreement
Métis National Council
Métis Nation of Alberta
Métis in Alberta
Métis Nation British Columbia
Métis Community Association of Vancouver
Manitoba Métis Federation
Métis Nation - Saskatchewan
Métis Nation of Ontario
Métis Population Betterment Act
Métis-sur-Mer, Quebec
Métis people (United States)
Mixed-blood
Mohawk language
Mukluk
Music of Nunavut

N
Na-Dene languages
Nanfan Treaty
Nahnebahwequa
Nanook
Nanook of the North
National Aboriginal Day
National Aboriginal Health Organization
Native American cuisine
Native American art
Native Education Centre
Native Friendship Centre
Native Women's Association of Canada
Nellie Cournoyea
New World
Nicola (chief)
Nicola language
Nicole Redhead
Nine Years' War
Nisga'a Final Agreement
Nisga'a language
North American fur trade
Northwest Coast art
Northwest Indian War
Northern Regional Negotiations Table
North West Company – North West fur Company (1779 to 1821)
North-West Rebellion
Norton tradition
Numbered Treaties
Treaty 1 – August 1871
Treaty 2 – August 1871
Treaty 3 – October 1873
Treaty 4 – September 1874
Treaty 5 – September 1875 (adhesions from 1908–1910)
Treaty 6 – August–September 1876 (adhesions in February 1889)
Treaty 7 – September 1877
Treaty 8 – June 1899 (with further signings and adhesions until 1901)
Treaty 9 – July 1905
Treaty 10 – August 1906
Treaty 11 – June 1921
Nunamiut
Nunatsiavummiutut
Nunavut Arctic College
Nunavut Land Claims Agreement
Nuu-chah-nulth
Nuu-chah-nulth mythology
Nuxálk language

O
Ogemawahj Tribal Council
Ojibwe writing systems
Oowekyala language
Oka Crisis
Okichitaw
Old Copper complex
Old Crow Flats
One Dead Indian
Onkweonwe
Ontario Minamata disease
Ozette Indian Village Archeological Site

P
Paleo-Eskimo
Paleo-Indians
Payipwat (Piapot)
Paulette Caveat
Petun
Penetanguishene Bay Purchase
Pitikwahanapiwiyin (Poundmaker)
Poundmaker Cree Nation
Plano culture
Plank house
Plastic shaman
Pittailiniit
Plains Indians
Point Peninsula complex
Police
Population history of American indigenous peoples
Potlatch
Pontiac's Rebellion
Pow-wow
Powley ruling
Pierre de Troyes, Chevalier de Troyes
Pitikwahanapiwiyin
Prince Albert Volunteers
Pre-Columbian
Public consultation
Pwi-Di-Goo-Zing Ne-Yaa-Zhing Advisory Services

Q
Qiviut
Queen Anne's War

R
R. v. Badger
R. v. Marshall; R. v. Bernard
R. v. Marshall
R. v. Drybones
R. v. Gladstone
R. v. Gonzales
R. v. Guerin
R. v. Sparrow
R. v. Van der Peet
Rancherie
Re Eskimos
Red Paint People
Red River Rebellion
Red River ox cart
Royal Commission on Aboriginal Peoples
Royal Proclamation of 1763
Rupert's Land
Rupert's Land Act 1868

S
St. Catherines Milling v. The Queen
St. Jude's Cathedral (Iqaluit)
St. Lawrence Iroquoians
Sacred bundle
Salishan languages
Saskatchewan Indian Institute of Technologies
Saugeen complex
Saugeen Tract Agreement
Section Thirty-five of the Constitution Act, 1982
Section Twenty-five of the Canadian Charter of Rights and Freedoms
Status of First Nations treaties in British Columbia
Secwepemc Cultural Education Society
Secwepemc Museum and Heritage Park
Settler Colonialism in Canada
Seven Nations of Canada
Shamanism among Eskimo peoples
Shingwauk Kinoomaage Gamig
Siqqitiq
Sisiutl
Sixty Years' War (1754–1814)
French and Indian War (1754–1763)
Pontiac's Rebellion (1763–1765)
Lord Dunmore's War (1774)
Frontier warfare during the American Revolution (1775–1783)
Northwest Indian War (1786–1794)
War of 1812 (1812–1814)
Skaay
Sk'elep
Skookum
Squamish people
Squamish culture
Squamish history
Squamish language
Sled dog
Spoken languages of Canada#Indigenous languages
Squaw
St'at'imcets language
Status of First Nations treaties in British Columbia
Stereotypes of Native Americans
Stó:lō
Slahal
Soulcatcher
Spirit of Haida Gwaii
Sun Dance

T
The Canadian Crown and Aboriginal peoples (Main political article)
Teiaiagon
Terres en vues/Land InSights
The Great Peacemaker
Three Sisters (agriculture)
Thunderbird Park (Victoria, British Columbia)
Thule people
Tlingit language
Toggling harpoon
Totem pole
Travois
Treaty of 1818
Treaty of Fort Niagara
Treaty of Hartford (1638)
Tribal College Librarians Institute
Tikigaq
Treaty of Fort Niagara
Tribal Council
Tsimshian mythology
Tunngavik Federation of Nunavut
Two-Spirit

U
Ulu
Urban Indian reserve
Umiak
Unceded territory
Union of Ontario Indians
Uu-a-thluk

V
Vancouver Métis Community Association

W
Waabnoong Bemjiwang Association of First Nations 
Wabbicommicot 
Wampum
Wakashan languages
Wawatay Native Communications Society
War of 1812
Chronology of the War of 1812
War of 1812 Campaigns
Niagara campaign
Results of the War of 1812
Tecumseh
Tecumseh's War
War canoe
Western Confederacy
Wiigwaasabak
Winalagalis Treaty Group
Windigo First Nations Council
Wolseley Expedition
World Council of Indigenous Peoples
Working Group on Indigenous Populations
Wyandot religion

X
X̱á:ytem

Y
Yellowquill College
Yupik languages
Yukon River Inter-Tribal Watershed Council

Search
Search all pages with prefix
All pages beginning with "Aboriginal"
All pages beginning with "First Nations"
All pages beginning with "Inuit"
All pages beginning with "Métis"
Search all pages with title

See also

Outline of Canada
Bibliography of Canada
Index of Canada-related articles (Parent index of Canada)
List of Canada-related topics by provinces and territories (Clickable maps)

External links

 Aboriginal Canada Portal
 The Atlas of CanadaExplore Our MapsHistory
 The Canadian Museum of Civilization-First Peoples Section
 Films about Aboriginal peoples at NFB.ca
 First Nations Seeker
 A History of Aboriginal Treaties and Relations in Canada
 Map of historical territory treaties with Aboriginal peoples in Canada
 Naming guidelines of Indian and Northern Affairs Canada, Government of Canada
 Report of the Royal Commission on Aboriginal Peoples

 
Canadian Aboriginals